Tongio is a town in Victoria, Australia. It is located on the Great Alpine Road, south of Omeo.

History
Tongio's namesake is the Aboriginal Tongio Munjie, and the town was first settled in 1839 by Codie Buckley. While there is no record of when the Tongio hotel was built, the earliest license was granted on 17 November 1884 to Jack Weston.

Demographics
As of the 2016 Australian census, 65 people resided in Tongio. The median age of persons in Tongio was 58 years. There were more males than females, with 56.7% of the population male and 43.3% female. The average household size was 2.4 people per household.

References

Towns in Victoria (Australia)
Shire of East Gippsland